Leptomerosepsis is a genus of flies in the family Sepsidae.

Species
Leptomerosepsis improvisa Ozerov, 1996
Leptomerosepsis rubiginosa Ozerov, 1996
Leptomerosepsis ruwenzoriensis (Vanschuytbroeck, 1963)
Leptomerosepsis simplicicrus (Duda, 1926)

References

Sepsidae
Diptera of Africa
Taxa named by Oswald Duda
Brachycera genera